is a 1968 tokusatsu science fiction film directed by Kinji Fukasaku and produced by Walter Manley and Ivan Reiner. It was written by William Finger, Tom Rowe and Charles Sinclair from a story by Reiner. The film was shot in Japan with a Japanese director and film crew, but with the non-Japanese starring cast of Robert Horton, Richard Jaeckel and Luciana Paluzzi.

After destroying a huge asteroid that was on a rapid collision course with Earth, a group of astronauts discover they have accidentally returned to their space station with an alien slime creature that feeds on radiation and can reproduce rapidly from its own blood.

Plot
A group of scientists discover that an asteroid, named Flora (which may or may not be the real asteroid 8 Flora, although the mass of 6,000,000 tons or tonnes given for Flora is orders of magnitude less than the mass of 8 Flora), is on a collision course with Earth. The space program summons Commander Jack Rankin to take command of space station Gamma 3 and destroy the asteroid, stating that if he should fail to not bother coming back because the asteroid collision would cause an extinction event.

Rankin goes to Gamma 3 where he runs into an old comrade Commander Vince Elliot, with whom he has a history. Nevertheless, Rankin carries out the mission commanding a shuttle onto the surface of Flora to set bombs to destroy it. While on the surface, they discover a strange amoeba like creature attaching to their vehicles and sucking the energy out. The science officer Dr Halversen tries to bring a sample of the green substance aboard the shuttle in a sealed container, but Rankin angrily throws the container to the ground causing it to shatter and some of the green slime to attach to Halversen's space suit.

The detonation is a success and Flora is destroyed. The crew returns to Gamma 3 to celebrate while their suits go through decontamination. The energy from decontamination causes the green slime to evolve and grow and in the middle of the celebration and alarm goes off indicating trouble in the decontamination chamber. An officer opening the door is quickly killed by an unknown assailant.

When the senior officers arrive to investigate, they find the crew member electrocuted to death and a strange one-eyed tentacled creature that discharges lethal amounts of electricity. When they attempt to kill it with their laser weapons, they find that the creature's electricity causes the blood to multiply their numbers and there are quickly more creatures. Despite the attempts to contain the creatures, they quickly multiply even more to the point where they will soon overrun the station. Dr. Halversen is killed trying to contain the creatures.

Rankin, refusing to leave until the mission is completed, stays in command and decides to evacuate the station on shuttles and set the station to burn up in Earth's atmosphere. Elliott returns to help his friend and is killed trying to save him. Rankin manages to set up the crash landing and escapes with Elliott's body onto the shuttle as the station burns up and destroys all of the green slime creatures. Rankin logs the mission success and recommends the highest citation for Vince Elliott posthumously.

Cast
 Robert Horton as Commander Jack Rankin
 Richard Jaeckel as Commander Vince Elliott
 Luciana Paluzzi as Dr. Lisa Benson
 Bud Widom as General Jonathan B. Thompson
 Ted Gunther as Dr. Hans Halversen
 Robert Dunham as Captain Martin
 David Yorston as Lieutenant Curtis
 William Ross as Ferguson
 Gary Randolf as Cordier

Japanese dub
 Gorō Naya as Jack Rankin
 Ichirō Murakoshi as Vince Elliott
 Haruko Kitahama as Lisa Benson
 Kōsei Tomita as Johnathon B. Thompson

Production
The Green Slime was a co-production between Metro-Goldwyn-Mayer, Ram Films, and Toei. MGM provided the funding and script while Toei provided the film crew and location to shoot the film. It was the second ever film co-produced by Ram Films and Toei after the 1966 film Terror Beneath the Sea.

The storyline for The Green Slime originated in Italy, where MGM also had dealings. Years before The Green Slime went into production, MGM had contracted Italian filmmaker Antonio Margheriti to direct what was intended to be a series of four television movies about the adventures of a space station called Gamma One. Margheriti's films in the series consisted of Wild, Wild Planet, War of the Planets, War Between the Planets and Snow Devils, all created over a period of three months and released in 1965. MGM was impressed with Margheriti's films and released the four films theatrically. Gamma One producers Manley and Reiner were eager to take advantage of these films and made The Green Slime as an unofficial fifth entry in the film series. The only connection the film had to Margheriti's films is the space station, retitled Gamma Three, which had a similar design as the one in Margheriti's films.

The US theatrical release includes a subplot involving Dr. Lisa Benson as a shared love interest between Rankin (a former flame) and Vince (her current fiance). The Japanese release version leaves out this subplot to make the film faster paced.

Green Slime was shot in Japan with a predominantly Asian film crew and Western actors. Aside from Horton, Jaeckel and Paluzzi, the rest of the cast consisted of amateur and semi-professional Western actors living in Japan at the time. Yoshikazu Yamasawa was the cinematographer, and the film was edited by Osamu Tanaka. Toshiaki Tsushima composed the original score. Charles Fox re-scored much of the film for its release in United States, including the title song.

Release
The Green Slime was released in Japan in December 1968. The film premiered in the United States on December 1, 1968, receiving a general theatrical release on May 21, 1969. The Japanese version runs 77 minutes in comparison to the 90-minute version released in the United States by MGM, removing the arguments between the Rankin and Elliot characters.

Home media
The film's Japanese language version debuted in 2004 on DVD without English subtitles or dialog. On October 26, 2010, the American theatrical release debuted on DVD as part of the Warner Archive Collection. On October 10. 2017, Warner re-released the film on high-definition Blu-ray.

Reception
Contemporary reviews of the film were mostly negative. Monthly Film Bulletin referred to the film as "junior league science fiction" that was "certainly schoolboy stuff". The review commented on the monsters in the film, stating that "the first appearance of the green slime looks promising, but the transformation of the lurid jelly into stock monsters is something of a let-down". Variety referred to the film as "a poor man's version of 2001", and described the story, script and special effects as "amateurish". The New York Times stated that the film "opens promisingly, keeps it up for about half an hour but then fades badly [...] the picture falls to pieces when the green menace becomes an army of rubbery-looking goblins".

In a retrospective review, Stuart Galbraith IV discussed the film in his book Japanese Science Fiction, Fantasy and Horror Films, finding that Fukasaku's direction was "flat and uninteresting" and that the special effects by ex-Toho employees Yukio Manoda and Akira Watanabe were worse than their previous work with Eiji Tsuburaya, noting that the "miniatures are badly lit and lacking in detail". Galbraith commented that the film was "ultimately undone by some of the most laughably ridiculous monsters in screen history" and that "the film isn't bad until the critters show up". In Phil Hardy's book Science Fiction (1984), the film was described as "not a very convincing entry in the vegetable monster movie subgenre".

Aftermath and influence
The Green Slime was used for the pilot episode of the film-mocking television series Mystery Science Theater 3000 in 1988 on KTMA. The episode differed from others as it lacked the character Tom Servo, instead featuring a puppet named Beeper who only spoke in beeps that Crow T. Robot could understand. It was also a major source of inspiration for the 1979 board game The Awful Green Things from Outer Space.

Every year The Green Slime Award is given out for that year's worst in science fiction at Bubonicon, a tradition started by writer Roy Tackett in 1976.

See also
 List of American films of 1968
 List of Japanese films of 1968
 List of films featuring space stations
 List of science fiction films of the 1960s

References

Footnotes

Sources

Mystery Science Theater 3000
 
 Episode guide: K00- The Green Slime (the unaired pilot)

External links
 
 
 
 
 
 
 
 The Green Slime synopsis and review from And You Call Yourself a Scientist

1968 films
Fiction about near-Earth asteroids
1960s English-language films
English-language Japanese films
Films about astronauts
Films directed by Kinji Fukasaku
Films shot in Japan
Films about impact events
1960s Japanese-language films
Metro-Goldwyn-Mayer films
1960s monster movies
1960s science fiction horror films
Space adventure films
Toei tokusatsu films
Japanese science fiction horror films
1960s Japanese films